The Hodzana River is a  tributary of the Yukon River in the U.S. state of Alaska. The Yukon Flats National Wildlife Refuge covers a large part of the river basin.

Beginning west of Dall Mountain just south of the Arctic Circle, the river flows northeast into the wildlife refuge, then southeast to Hodzana Slough, an arm of the Yukon.

See also
List of rivers of Alaska

References

Rivers of Alaska
Rivers of Yukon–Koyukuk Census Area, Alaska
Tributaries of the Yukon River
Rivers of Unorganized Borough, Alaska